(–)-18-Methylaminocoronaridine (18-MAC) is a second generation synthetic derivative of ibogaine developed by the research team led by the pharmacologist Stanley D. Glick from the Albany Medical College and the chemist Martin E. Kuehne from the University of Vermont.

See also 
 2-Methoxyethyl-18-methoxycoronaridinate
 18-Methoxycoronaridine
 Coronaridine
 Ibogaine
 Noribogaine
 Voacangine

References 

Drug rehabilitation
Iboga
Nicotinic antagonists